Fengmuqiao Township is a rural township in Ningxiang County, Changsha City, Hunan Province, China. Fengmuqiao township and Xieleqiao town merged to Huitang town on November 19, 2015.

Administrative division
The township is divided into eleven villages: Niujiao Village, Fengmu Village, Xing Village, Shanlong Village, Yuanhe Village, Dongting Village, Shuangjing Village, Yangtang Village, Xinfeng Village, Hongqiao Village and Yongxin Village.

Geography
Dongting Reservoir is located in the town and discharges into the Wei River.

Economy
Tobacco is important to the economy.

Culture
Huaguxi is the most influential form of theater in the local area.

Attractions
Longxing Temple is a Buddhist temple in the town and a scenic spot.

Notable individuals
 (1888–1942), revolutionary.
Chin Hou-hsiu, mother of Ma Ying-jeou, the President of the Republic of China (Taiwan).

References

Historic towns and townships of Ningxiang